Lucky Ali is an Indian singer-songwriter, musician, composer, record producer, actor and philanthropist. He is best known for his soulful but strikingly simple ballad-style singing and melodious voice.

His discography contains 6 studio albums, 7 compilations, 7 singles, 18 soundtracks, 2 concert tour and 2 other albums (as a composer).

Studio albums

Compilations

Soundtracks

Singles

Concerts and tours 

 Seher:Lucky Ali Concert (2006)
 Road Show Tour (for his album Raasta Man) (2011)
 The Carnival of Music (2012)
 Lucky Ali Band - Harley Davidson Biker Fest , Goa 2018
 Lucky Ali Band - 30 years of Lucky Ali - Safarnama Tour (2019 - 2020) 
 Lucky Ali Band - Zomaland 2019
 Lucky Ali Band - Riders festival 2019 
 Lucky Ali Band - Dubai Expo 2020 
 Lucky Ali Band - India tour (2021 - 2022)
 Lucky Ali Band - Live at The Agenda , Dubai (2022) 
 Lucky Ali Band - Live at Majuli Music Festival (2022)

Other albums

See also 
 Lucky Ali videography

References

Ali, Lucky